This is a list of wars involving the Republic of Yemen and its predecessor states.

North Yemen

South Yemen

Unified Yemen

References

 
Yemen
Wars